Harry Fry may refer to:

Harry Fry (racehorse trainer) (born 1986), British racehorse trainer
Harry Fry (rower) (1905–1985), Canadian Olympic rower
Harry Fry (rugby union) (born 2001), Welsh rugby union player